The National Collegiate Athletic Association basketball tournament is held every first semester of the academic year (from July up to November). Each year, ten schools vie to win the two championships: the Juniors and Seniors. If a school wins both championships in one season, it said that they have won the "double championship."

The tournament commences with a double-round robin of eliminations, where the four teams with the best records advance to the semifinals, with the two top seeds clinching the twice-to-beat advantage. The winners in the semifinals meet in a best-of-3 finals series, in order to determine the champion.

The championship is continually contested since the NCAA's foundation in 1924, except during World War II and the mid-1960s when scandals rocked the association.

The athletic nicknames of the different teams variously came from the school's founders, or from a distinct quality that separated a school from the others.

Notably, the first champion of this event was crowned in 1925, 14 years before the U.S. NCAA tournament was instituted.

Tournament format
Since 1996, the ten member schools have fielded their varsity teams in a double round elimination tournament, where the schools play each other twice. The four teams with the best records advance to the crossover semifinals, popularly known as the Final Four.

The two top teams have a twice to beat advantage. The lower ranked teams need to win twice against the higher ranked teams to advance to the best-of-three finals, where the first team to reach two wins becomes the NCAA basketball champion.

Tie-breakers
If two teams are tied, a playoff will be held.
If three or more teams are tied, teams will be ranked by basis of head-to-head records, goal differential from games of the tied teams, then overall goal differential. Then the teams will be seeded on a mini-tournament in a series of elimination games.

Group stage sweep
If any event a team finishes the group stage undefeated, that team will advance outright to the finals. The third and fourth seeds will have a sudden-death game to determine the opponent of the second seed. Then, the winner of the sudden-death match between the second seed and third/fourth seed advances to the finals to face the first seed. Previously, the first seed holds a twice to beat advantage in the finals (the finals would not be a best of three affair), until 2008, the finals was in a best-of-three series even if a team swept the group stage. Since 2010 the team who sweeps the group stage will automatically go to the finals with a thrice-to-beat advantage and a 1-0 edge over their opponent, their opponent needs to beat them thrice while the team who sweeps the 2-round elimination will just have to beat their opponents twice.

Previous formats
Prior to 1997, when the NCAA had, for most part of its history, six teams, it employed a split season format. The winner of the first round (the team with the highest standing) would notch the first Final berth, while the winner of the second round would notch the second Final berth.

If a team manages to have the best overall record, yet fails to win either round, that team will play the winner of the second round in a playoff game, to face the winner of the first round in the Championship game. The games of the Championship round are all single-elimination matches, until the 1980s when the Championship game was expanded to a best-of-three series.

If a team manages to win both rounds (not necessarily a sweep), the Championship round will be omitted, and that team will be declared outright champions.

In cases of tie, a playoff game will be played to determine which team won the round. If more than two teams are tied, each team will play the teams they are tied with once. If for example, a team won the first round, and is tied with another team for first place at the second round, a playoff game will be played to determine which team wins the round. If the team that won the first round wins in the playoff game, the Championship round will be omitted, since the team won both rounds. If the other team wins, a Championship round will held, since two different teams won the two rounds.

The 2021 tournament, held in early 2022, was in a special format used only for that season. There was only one round of eliminations, and a play-in tournament was held for teams that finished third to sixth; after that, the regular Final Four format was used.

History
 1924: The NCAA began its first season. In basketball, the Ateneo de Manila won the Midgets title, De La Salle College won the Juniors title, and the University of the Philippines won the seniors title.
 1927: San Beda won their first Seniors title in the NCAA's fourth season.
 1928: Letran joined the NCAA. On the same year the Squires won their first juniors championship and then went on winning two more, thus establishing NCAA's first three consecutive juniors championships.
 1936: UP and UST withdrew permanently from the NCAA. FEU also withdrew.
 1939: A pair of Ateneo-De La Salle Final games were held at the Rizal Memorial Coliseum. The juniors De La Salle team defeated the Ateneo juniors team, while later on the day the De La Salle seniors team defeated the Ateneo seniors team. The De La Salle seniors team captured their first NCAA Basketball title.
 1941: Ateneo de Manila and Jose Rizal College won the last basketball championships before the start of World War II.
 1947: The Championship Game went into the last shot, which led to De La Salle winning the first basketball championship after the Pacific War, against Mapua.
 1950: At the final game of the group stage, the Letran Knights were assured of a title, for they've won the two rounds, but the San Beda Red Lions beat them on the final non-bearing game, depriving them of a season sweep.
 1955: San Beda won the three-legged Crispulo Zamora Cup defeating Ateneo de Manila.
 1962: At the Final game, a riot ensued when Mapua supporters alleged that a referee favored the Ateneo team. The Eagles won the game, and the championship.
 1967: De La Salle chose the up-and-coming De La Salle-Green Hills as their new Juniors' counterpart after the original De La Salle High School was phased out.
 1972: The JRC Heavy Bombers won their last (as of 2014) NCAA title, with all of the team's starting five being drafted to the newly formed Philippine Basketball Association three years later.
 1973: The SSC-R Golden Stags, led by David Supnet, won their first ever NCAA Seniors Basketball crown.
 1974: First round pennant winners De La Salle defeated second round pennant winners Ateneo 90-80 to win the NCAA championship. Lim Eng Beng, who held the all-time points per game average (32 ppg) breaks NCAA record of most points scored in a game (55 pts).
 1977: In the 1977 finals series, Ateneo de Manila and San Beda had their melee at the Araneta Coliseum. This led to a closed-door match, wherein Ateneo de Manila's Pons Valdez's last shot was disallowed as time expired, giving San Beda the victory.
 1978: Association-wide violence led to the withdrawal of Ateneo de Manila from the NCAA. At the time Ateneo de Manila left, it had the most titles in men's basketball, a record that would only be tied and surpassed in 2003. San Beda withdrew in 1982 but came back in 1986.
1979: Letran was declared as the winner by beating Mapua Cardinals with the score of 63-62 in the second round of the tournament and the fact that they were also the champion in the first round tournament. The team was so strong that no one was able to match their firepower as the team was so strong in all the departments and it took the Knights four years in the making before becoming the champion of the association. The team's lineup was headed by Ramon San Juan (G-F), Ted McKinney (C), Itoy Esguerra (F), Bong Aninon (F), Nonie Robles (G-F), Tim Coloso (G) Eddie Baldomero (G), Bobby Valenzuela (C), Tony DeLeon (C), Mon Navales (G), William Alberto (G) and Boyet Olano (G). Ramon San Juan was voted Most Valuable Player of the tournament.
Some of the Letran team players were products of their Varsity High School Team namely: Ted McKinney, Ramon San Juan, William Alberto and were also part of the 1976 National Inter-Secondary Champion Team that was held in Baguio City wherein they beat their NCAA rival San Beda College with the score of 52-51
It was a double victory for the Muralla-based cagers as they dominated in winning the Jrs and Srs NCAA Basketball Championship that year. They were also declared the General Champion by the NCAA Management for winning most of the events that the NCAA has provided. It was very sweet for the Knights for getting that award as it was their first time dominating all events.
 1980: De La Salle fans and Letran supporters engaged themselves in a brawl during the second round of eliminations in the 1980 season. The Rizal Memorial Coliseum was wrecked apart as the two sides ripped apart the chairs bolted to the ground and threw them as weapons. The Basketball Association of the Philippines aborted the 1980 season and suspended Letran from all events. In 1981, the association readmitted Letran, which led to De La Salle withdrawing from the NCAA. De La Salle went to the UAAP, but was denied membership on their first try (with a vote of 5-2, with Ateneo de Manila and UST voting against). De La Salle was finally admitted to the UAAP in 1986 but was required to drop LSGH as their Juniors' counterpart. De La Salle chose De La Salle-Zobel as their new high school team.
 1982: Avelino Lim led the Knights to two pennants, scrapping the championship round, with their only loss coming from the San Sebastian Golden Stags. This would be the start of a three-year championship streak of Letran.
 1985: The SSC-R Golden Stags won their second NCAA Seniors Basketball crown and their first in twelve years. They also ended Letran's championship streak at 3. Alvin Patrimonio of the Mapua Cardinals won the season MVP plum.
 1988: The SSC-R Golden Stags became the first team in NCAA history to sweep the Seniors Basketball tournament. They won the first and second round pennants and ended up as eventual champions with a 10-0 record. 1987 NCAA MVP Eugene Quilban won his back-to-back MVP award. Paul Alvarez played in his last NCAA season and ended up as a champion.
 1989: Only in their fifth year in the association, the Perpetual Help Altas, led by season MVP Eric Clement Quiday and Rene "Bong" Hawkins barged into the NCAA finals. However, they were beaten by the defending champions, the SSC-R Golden Stags, in the three-game series. The Stags' Eugene Quilban, who played in his last season, was named as the best player of the series-clinching game. 
 1991: Benito Cheng of Mapua scored on the last second of the deciding Game 3 to deny San Beda the championship at the ULTRA. The Cardinals snapped their "once in sixteen years" championship curse as the Red Lions extended their title drought to 13 years. MVP Antonio Valeriano of the Lions was a non-factor in the championship round.
 1993: Season MVP Jesse Bardaje and rookie Ulysses Tanigue led the SSC-R Golden Stags to the first of five straight NCAA Seniors Basketball crowns. Led by Tanigue's 27 points, the Stags clinched the championship during their ninth game of the season via a 110-76 rout over the Letran Knights for an 8-1 record. With the win, the team copped the second round pennant and the automatic championship for the season. The newly crowned champion Stags finished with an overall record of 8-2 after losing their non-bearing last game to the Mapua Cardinals. Coach Arturo "Turo" Valenzona won his first championship in the NCAA.
 1994: The SSC-R Golden Stags achieved the second clean sweep in NCAA Seniors' Basketball history and automatically won the championship. The team finished with a 10-0 record. Stags John Rodney Santos and Romel Adducul received the season MVP and Rookie of the Year awards, respectively.
 1995: The SSC-R Golden Stags made their first ever three-peat championship and became the fifth team to do so in NCAA Seniors Basketball history. The Stags raced to a 9-0 start for a 19-game winning streak dating back to the previous season before losing their last regular season game against the MVP Ruben Dela Rosa led-Mapua Cardinals, the second round pennant winner they eventually swept in the best-of-three finals to end up with an 11-1 card.
 1996: The SSC-R Golden Stags became the first team in NCAA history to win four straight Seniors Basketball crowns. They swept the second round pennant winner SBC Red Lions in the best-of-three finals to end up with an overall record of 12-2. Romel Adducul was named as the NCAA MVP. SSC-R also celebrated its 50th (Golden) anniversary as an academic institution. 
 1997: San Sebastian College-Recoletos, which was led by the Sensational Six in back-to-back MVP Romel Adducul, Aramis Calpito, Jasper Ocampo, Ulysses Tanigue, Brixter Encarnacion, and team captain Rommel Daep, made a 12-0 seniors regular season sweep. All six players won their fourth championship individually, with Adducul, Calpito, and Ocampo winning four straight dating back to 1994. The Golden Stags faced San Beda in the finals with a twice-to-beat advantage and prevailed, 84-72, after leading by just four at halftime. They capped off a five-year run as NCAA champions by way of another clean sweep, the third in NCAA Seniors Basketball history, with an overall record of 13-0. The Stags also averaged 89.5 points per game during the season while limiting their opponents to 69.16 points per contest. Reserves Jerome Barbosa, Michael "Topex" Robinson, Alvin Pua, and rookie Mark Macapagal were also part of the legendary 1997 San Sebastian team, arguably the best and most dominating team in NCAA history. Rookie coach Arturo "Bay" Cristobal piloted the team. The Stags' Sensational Six left after the 1997 season, leaving behind a young squad which will be eventually led in 1998 by Barbosa, Robinson, Macapagal, Pua, and rookies Homer Se and Christian Coronel, the 1998 Rookie of the Year.
 1998: St. Benilde is admitted to the NCAA while De La Salle-Green Hills returns to the association after a 17-year absence. The Letran Knights, led by rookie coach Luis Francisco "Louie" Alas, NCAA "oldie" Christian Calaguio (1998 NCAA MVP) and promising sophomore Kerby Raymundo (1997 Rookie of the Year), capitalized on the departure of the Sensational Six and won the NCAA Seniors Basketball crown.
 1999: The Letran Knights became the first fourth-seeded team to upset the top seed in the NCAA Final Four when they defeated the SSC-R Golden Stags twice. That feat was soon duplicated by the Golden Stags the following season when they beat the JRC Heavy Bombers twice to enter the 2000 NCAA finals. The Knights also won the 1999 NCAA Seniors Basketball crown against the Heavy Bombers in a fight-marred championship series. That was their 14th NCAA Seniors Basketball title and it tied them with the Ateneo de Manila Blue Eagles for the most NCAA Seniors Basketball crowns. They were led by 1999 NCAA MVP Kerby Raymundo, Allan Salangsang, John Paul Prior, William "Billy" Moody, Orlann Tama, and rookie coach Vincent "Binky" Favis.
 2000: College of Saint of Benilde won their first NCAA seniors title despite joining the association only two seasons ago. This marks the fastest win for any new school in the association since the World War. In the Juniors finals, the Letran Squires qualified outright for the finals with a 14-0 record. However, they were beaten twice by the Mapua Red Robins in the finals. This was the last Juniors championship of the Mapua Institute of Technology prior to phasing out the old Mapua High School.
 2003: The Letran Knights became the most-titled team in NCAA seniors basketball history after clinching their 15th crown. They defeated the defending champions SSC-R Golden Stags in the finals. Ronjay Enrile was named as the 2003 NCAA Finals MVP.
 2004: The NCAA Seniors finals featured two schools that have never won a championship before, Philippine Christian University and the newly renamed University of Perpetual Help Dalta System. The PCU Dolphins won the series in two games, with Gabriel Espinas becoming the first-ever Most Valuable Player and Rookie of the Year within the same season.
 2006: San Beda finally broke their 28-year championship drought as they edged out three-time finalist PCU Dolphins in the final game that went down to the wire. Rookie MVP Samuel Ekwe and fFinals MVP Yousif Aljamal led the Red Lions, which became the 3rd most-titled team in NCAA Seniors Basketball history with 12 crowns.
 2009: The SSC-R Golden Stags broke San Beda's three-year championship run with a 2–0 sweep in their finals series. The Stags won their first 15 games, an association seniors' basketball record, and ended their 7-year title drought. They also won a total of 19 games, an all-time season record in the association. San Sebastian's last finals appearance was in 2003, losing to Letran in 3 games.
 2010: San Beda made a 16-0 sweep in the group stage. They also swept the finals which makes their record a historic 18-0.
 2011: San Sebastian stopped San Beda's 26-game winning streak since 2010 by beating them on their 1st round meeting but San Beda got their revenge on the 2nd round over San Sebastian and forced a playoff for number 1 seed which San Beda won. For the sixth year in a row San Beda ended the group stage as the number one team and went on to the finals. San Beda then went on to win their 2nd championship in a row by sweeping San Sebastian in the finals once again.
 2012: San Beda became the most-titled team in the association, with 17 championships, by beating Letran in the finals. This was their sixth championship in seven years and their seventh consecutive finals appearance.
 2013: San Beda became the school with the most double championships with 5 after the Red Cubs and the Red Lions won the championship in both the juniors and seniors divisions against their respective opponents. Since the Red Cubs and the Red Lions had been the reigning juniors and seniors champions since 2010, San Beda thus became the first school to achieve a 4th-straight double championship.
 2014: San Beda Red Lions won their 19th seniors basketball championship and become only the second team to win 5 consecutive championships after San Sebastian did the trick from 1993–1997. This was their eighth championship in the last nine years and their ninth consecutive finals appearance. Likewise, the San Beda Red Cubs won their 21st juniors basketball championship and became the first team in NCAA history to win six straight championships.
 2015: Letran ended San Beda Red Lions' five-year title reign. The Knights won their 17th seniors basketball championship after a 10-year drought. The Red Lions appeared in the finals for a record 10th time but lost their second. Meanwhile, the San Beda Red Cubs won their 22nd juniors basketball championship and this time, became the first team in NCAA history to win seven straight championships.
 2016: San Beda Red Lions won their 20th seniors basketball championship. This was their ninth championship in the last eleven years and their eleventh consecutive finals appearance. San Beda became the first host school, since 2005, to win the title. In the juniors tournament, the Malayan Red Robins ended San Beda Red Cubs' seven-year championship run. This is the Malayan Red Robins' first juniors basketball championship, since the old Mapua High School has phased out in 2000.
 2017: San Beda won their 21st seniors basketball championship by defeating the season leaders and first-time finals contenders, Lyceum Pirates. This was their tenth championship in twelve years and their twelfth consecutive finals appearance. In the juniors tournament, the De La Salle Greenies dethroned the Malayan Red Robins to win their first championship in NCAA history.
 2019: Letran Knights dethroned San Beda again after 4 years, ending their three-year championship streak. The Knights won their 18th seniors basketball championship. In the juniors tournament, the San Beda Red Cubs won their 23rd juniors basketball championship by defeating the Lyceum Junior Pirates.
 2022: Letran won their 20th seniors basketball championship, made their second three-peat for the first time since Samboy Lim lead the team in his era from 1982 to 1984. Defeating the College of Saint Benilde Blazers, which entered finals for the first time since their last finals appearance in 2002, losing to the San Sebastian Stags.  Also in juniors, the Letran Squires also won their 13th championship by defeating the La Salle Green Hills Greenies. Marking the end of the 22-year title drought, and the first double championship of the school in both seniors and juniors since 1983.

NCAA basketball champions

Basketball, as the most popular sport in the Philippines, receives the most attention from the press and the sports-minded public. As a result, the NCAA Seniors Basketball championship is the most coveted title among the NCAA events.

San Beda has the most Seniors basketball title a record 22 times, followed by Colegio de San Juan de Letran with 19 and the Ateneo de Manila (now with the University Athletic Association of the Philippines) is third with 14.
There is a separate division for high school student-athletes, the Juniors division. San Beda High School has the most titles with 23 while the Malayan High School of Science (formerly Mapúa High School) won 22.

San Beda University leads the overall tally with 45 basketball titles, followed by Letran with 31. Among defunct members, Ateneo has the most championships, with 23.

The current champions are the Colegio de San Juan de Letran Letran Knights (seniors), and the San Beda University–Rizal Red Cubs (juniors).

Double Championships
When a school wins both the Juniors (or Midgets pre-1925) and Seniors tournament at the same season, the school is said to have won the double championship.

As of 2014, only seven schools were able to win the double championship:
 1925–26: University of the Philippines Manila
 1926–27: University of the Philippines Manila
 1931–32: Ateneo de Manila (juniors' title was shared)
 1932–33: Ateneo de Manila
 1933–34: Ateneo de Manila
 1937–38: Ateneo de Manila
 1939–40: De La Salle College
 1965–66: Mapúa Institute of Technology
 1975–76: Ateneo de Manila University
 1976–77: Ateneo de Manila University
 1978–79: San Beda College
 1979–80: Colegio de San Juan de Letran
 1983–84: Colegio de San Juan de Letran
 1988-89: San Sebastian College-Recoletos
 1989-90: San Sebastian College-Recoletos
 1993-94: San Sebastian College-Recoletos
 1994-95: San Sebastian College-Recoletos
 1995-96: San Sebastian College-Recoletos
 1997-98: San Sebastian College-Recoletos
 2001-02: San Sebastian College-Recoletos
 2002-03: San Sebastian College-Recoletos
 2009-10: San Sebastian College-Recoletos
 2010–11: San Beda College
 2011–12: San Beda College
 2012–13: San Beda College
 2013–14: San Beda College
 2014–15: San Beda College
 2022–23: Colegio de San Juan de Letran
Ateneo de Manila University, San Beda College and San Sebastian College-Recoletos have the most double championships with six apiece. San Beda College also has the most consecutive double championships with five.

Awards

Most Valuable Players

Season

Finals

Rookie of the Year

a. 2021 season was played in early 2022.

Scoring records
Lim Eng Beng of the De La Salle Green Archers currently holds the most points scored in an NCAA seniors' game when he scored 55 points in the 1974 season as he led De La Salle Green Archers to the championship. He scored an average of 32 points in that season which remains the all-time record in average points per game in Philippine Men's NCAA.

In 2009, Joshua Saret of the Jose Rizal Light Bombers scored 89 points against Angeles University Foundation to shatter the all-time high mark set by ex-teammate Keith Agovida at 82 points on September 5, 2008, against Malayan Science HS.

Prior to their record-breaking feats, Letran Squire Marlon Bola Bola held the single-game record of 71 points in 1970.

Seniors' scoring leaders
 Notes:
a. 2021-22 season was played in early 2022.

Origin of team monikers
 Arellano Chiefs: Named after the first Chief Justice of the Philippines, Cayetano Arellano, whom the university was named after.
 Letran Knights: The founder, Don Juan Geronimo Guerrero, was a Knight of Malta.
 CSB Blazers: As homage to the school's efforts in introducing several pioneering academic programs in the country.
 EAC Generals: Taken from the former name of the school, in honor of General Emilio Aguinaldo.
 JRU Heavy Bombers: World War II Japanese vintage bombs found in their campus.
 Lyceum Pirates: They are popularly known as Pirata ng Intramuros.
 Mapua Cardinals: From Major League Baseball's franchise, the St. Louis Cardinals, the favorite team of founder Tomas Mapua.
 San Beda Red Lions: Derived from the ancient British heraldic symbol, the Red Lion Rampant, which symbolizes courage. The Red Lion is a fitting symbol for a school named after the Venerable Bede of England, a Benedictine Saint and a great British intellectual. 
 San Sebastian Stags: A stag symbolizes a Christian who, filled with moral ideas, runs fast to God swiftly yet quietly in pursuit of his goals.
 UPHSD Altas: The moniker ‘Altas’ comes from the Latin word “height,” symbolizing UPHSD's aspirations for further greatness. At the same time, it comes from the initials of the school founder, Dr. Antonio L. Tamayo.

Memberships
 San Beda University is the only remaining founding member in the association.
 San Beda is also the school with the longest span of membership, at 89 years.
 The newest school to join the association is the Lyceum of the Philippines University which joined the association in 2011.
 La Salle Green Hills competed as the junior team of two senior squads in the NCAA. It first competed as the junior team of DLSU then of CSB.
 There were 3 schools who were guest teams in Season 85: the Emilio Aguinaldo College, Arellano University and the Angeles University Foundation. In 2010, EAC and Arellano were back as probationary members. The Lyceum of the Philippines University also played as a guest team in 2011. In 2013 Arellano became a regular member, so were EAC and Lyceum in 2015.

TV coverage
DZAQ-TV Channel 3 now ABS-CBN (1954-1961)
 Vintage Sports on PTV-4 (1986-1995)
 VTV on IBC-13 (1996–1999)
 PTV-4 (2000–2001)
 ABS-CBN Sports on Studio 23 (2002–2011) ABS-CBN Sports and Action (2015-2020), ABS-CBN Sports + Action HD (2016–2020)
 Sports5 (AKTV on IBC (2012), AksyonTV (2013-2014) and TV5 (2014)
 GMA 7 (2021–present) and GTV (2021–present)

References

See also
 National Collegiate Athletic Association (Philippines)#History
 National Collegiate Athletic Association (Philippines)#Rivalries
NCAA Final Four (Philippines)
UAAP Basketball Champions

 
Basketball
College men's basketball competitions in the Philippines
College women's basketball competitions in the Philippines